Yuriy Yuda (born 13 September 1983) is a Kazakh former cyclist. He competed in the madison at the 2004 Summer Olympics.

Major results
2003
 1st Madison, Asian Track Championships
 1st Stage 1 Jelajah Malaysia
 3rd National Time Trial Championships
2004
 3rd National Time Trial Championships
2005
 3rd Grand Prix Criquielion
2006
 3rd National Time Trial Championships

References

External links

1983 births
Living people
Kazakhstani male cyclists
Cyclists at the 2004 Summer Olympics
Olympic cyclists of Kazakhstan
People from Pavlodar
Kazakhstani track cyclists